is a Japan-exclusive soccer simulation video game for the Game Boy and Family Computer.

The Game Boy version (released almost 5 months before the start of the inaugural season of the J.League) was the first title officially licensed by the J.League.

See also
List of J.League licensed video games

References

External links
 J-League Fighting Soccer at Giant Bomb
 J-League Fighting Soccer (Game Boy) at GB no Game Seiha Shimasho 
 J-League Fighting Soccer (Game Boy) at GameFAQs
 J-League Fighting Soccer (Family Computer) at GameFAQs
 J-League Fighting Soccer at MobyGames

1992 video games
1993 video games
Information Global Service games
J.League licensed video games
Japan-exclusive video games
Game Boy games
Nintendo Entertainment System games
Video games set in 1993
Video games set in Japan
Multiplayer and single-player video games
Video games developed in Japan